This is list of archives in Hungary.

Archives in Hungary 

 National Archives (Hungary)
 National Audiovisual Archive of Hungary
 Blinken Open Society Archives
 The Artpool Archives
 The Hungarian Electronic Library

See also 

 List of archives
 List of museums in Hungary
 Culture of Hungary

Further reading

External links 

 
Archives
Hungary
Archives